Ficca is third album released by a Polish rock band Virgin. The album has earned a triple platinum certification in Poland with sales of over 100,000 units.

"Znak Pokoju" was the first single released from the album. The song was the biggest hit of 2005 and was at the top of Polish charts. It won the Srebrny Słowik on the Sopot Festival.

The album was re-released in June 2006.

Track listing 
 "Inni Przyjaciele" (Other friends)
 "Dezyda"		
 "Opowiem Ci" (I'll tell you)		
 "Superstar"		
 "Znak Pokoju" (Peace sign)		
 "Mam Wszystko W..." (I don't give a...)		
 "2 Bajki" (Two fairy tales)		
 "In Love"		
 "Piosenka na Imprezę" (Party song)		
 "Dla R. (Nieważne dziś jest)" (For R. - Today doesn't matter)		
 "Mam Tylko Ciebie" (wersja live) (I have only you - live version)

Ficca re-edition

Track listing 
 "Szansa"
 "Inni Przyjaciele"	
 "Dezyda"		
 "Opowiem Ci"		
 "Superstar"		
 "Znak Pokoju"		
 "Mam wszystko w..."		
 "2 Bajki"		
 "In Love"		
 "Piosenka na imprezę"		
 "Dla R. (Nieważne dziś jest)"		
 "Mam Tylko Ciebie" (live version)
 "Nie Zawiedź Mnie" (live version)
 "Znak Pokoju" (karaoke version)
 "Szansa" (karaoke version)

Charts and certifications

Charts

Certifications

References

2005 albums
2006 albums
Virgin (band) albums
Polish-language albums